Nadia Ali may refer to:

Nadia Ali (singer) (born 1980), American singer
Nadia Ali (actress) (born 1991), American pornographic actress
Nadia Ali (broadcaster) (born 1984), British broadcaster